The Peptococcaceae are a family of bacteria in the order Clostridiales.

References

External links 

 
Bacteria families